The Bram Stoker Award is a recognition presented annually by the Horror Writers Association (HWA) for "superior achievement" in dark fantasy and horror writing.

History
The Awards were established in 1987 and have been presented annually since 1988, and the winners are selected by ballot of the Active members of the HWA.  They are named after  Irish horror writer Bram Stoker, author of the novel Dracula, among others.

Several members of the HWA—including Dean Koontz—were reluctant to endorse such writing awards, fearing it would incite competitiveness rather than friendly admiration. The HWA therefore went to lengths to avoid mean-spirited competition, they agreed to specifically seek out new and neglected writers and works, and officially issue Awards not based on "best of the year" criteria, but "for superior achievement", which allows for ties.

Nominated works come from two different processes. Works can be recommended by any member of the HWA and a separate list of works is presented by a Jury for each category. Members with Active status then vote on works appearing on preliminary ballots. The field is thereby narrowed to the Final ballot; and Active members vote to choose the winners from that Final Ballot. Winners of a Bram Stoker Award receive a statuette made by New York firm, Society Awards.

The terms Bram Stoker Award and Bram Stoker Awards are registered trademarks of the Horror Writers Association.

Categories

Current categories

As of 2021 year of eligibility, with the ceremony convened in 2022, the Bram Stoker Award is presented for "Superior Achievement" in the following categories: 

 Novel (1987–)
 First Novel (1987–)
 Young Adult Novel (2011–)
 Graphic Novel (2011–)
 Long Fiction (1998–)
 Short Fiction (1998–)
 Anthology (1998–)
 Fiction Collection (1998–)
 Poetry Collection (2000–)
 Non-Fiction (1987–)
 Short Non-Fiction (2019–)
 Screenplay (1998–2004, 2011–)
 Lifetime Achievement (1987–)

Discontinued categories 
Discontinued categories include: 

 Novelette (1987–1997)
 Short Story (1987–1997)
 Collection (1987–1997)
 Work for Young Readers (1998–2004)
 Alternative Forms:
 Other Media (1993, 1998–2000)
 Alternative Forms (2001–2004)
 Illustrated Narrative (1998–2004)

Past winners
As of 2019, Stephen King holds the record for both the most nominations (33) and wins (13).  Other past award winners include:

 Linda Addison
 Maria Alexander
 Michael Arnzen
 Clive Barker
 Laird Barron
 Charles Beaumont
 Robert Bloch
 Bruce Boston
 Ray Bradbury
 Christopher Lee
 Gary A. Braunbeck
 Ramsey Campbell
 Douglas Clegg
 Don Coscarelli
 Ellen Datlow
 Harlan Ellison
 Neil Gaiman
 David Gerrold
 Owl Goingback
 Christopher Golden
 Rain Graves
 Thomas Harris
 Joe Hill

 Nina Kiriki Hoffman
 Nancy Holder
 Brian A. Hopkins
 Del Howison
 Charlee Jacob
 Stephen Jones
 Steven A. Katz
 Brian Keene
 Jack Ketchum
 Caitlin R. Kiernan
 Stephen King
 Michael Knost
 Kathe Koja
 Sarah Langan
 Joe R. Lansdale
 Richard Laymon
 Thomas Ligotti
 Bentley Little
 Jonathan Maberry
 George R. R. Martin
 Elizabeth Massie
 Rena Mason
 Richard Matheson
 Glen Mazzara
 Robert McCammon

 Thomas F. Monteleone
 Michael Moorcock
 Alan Moore
 David Morrell
 Lisa Morton
 Yvonne Navarro
 William F. Nolan
 Joyce Carol Oates
 Weston Ochse
 Norman Partridge
 Tom Piccirilli
 Alex Proyas
 Alan Rodgers
 Bruce Holland Rogers
 J. K. Rowling
 Al Sarrantonio
 John Shirley
 Dan Simmons
 Marge Simon
 Lucy A. Snyder
 Peter Straub
 Steve and Melanie Tem
 Robert Weinberg
 Rocky Wood
 EV Knight

References

External links
 Official Website

Bram Stoker Award
Awards established in 1987